S.W.A.T. is a 2003 American action crime thriller film directed by Clark Johnson and written by David Ayer and David McKenna, with the story credited to  Ron Mita and Jim McClain. Produced by Neal H. Moritz, it is based on the 1975 television series of the same name and stars Samuel L. Jackson, Colin Farrell, Michelle Rodriguez, LL Cool J, Josh Charles, Jeremy Renner, Brian Van Holt and Olivier Martinez. The plot follows Hondo (Jackson) and his SWAT team as they are tasked to escort an imprisoned drug kingpin/international fugitive to prison after he offers a $100 million reward to anyone who can break him out of police custody.

Plans for a film adaptation of the 1975 TV series began in the 1990s, but never materialized until the early 2000s. Johnson was hired as director and Jackson, Farrell and LL Cool J were cast in 2002.

S.W.A.T. was released in the United States on August 8, 2003. The film received mixed reviews from critics and grossed $207 million worldwide, making it the 22nd highest-grossing film of 2003.

Plot 
Los Angeles Police Department SWAT officer Jim Street, his partner Brian Gamble, and their team infiltrate a bank taken hostage by robbers, where Gamble disobeys orders and engages the robbers, causing a hostage to sustain injuries. He and Street manage to subdue the criminals, but are taken off the SWAT team by Captain Fuller, the commanding officer of the LAPD Metropolitan Division. Fuller offers Street a chance to rejoin the team by implicating Gamble, but he refuses and is demoted to working police inventory. Gamble, under the assumption that Street ratted on him to stay on SWAT, quits the force and ends their friendship.

Six months later, the chief of police calls on Sergeant Daniel "Hondo" Harrelson, a Marine Force Recon veteran, to reorganize the SWAT team. Hondo takes an interest in Street, a former U.S. Navy SEAL, and recruits him along with fellow officers TJ McCabe, Michael Boxer, Deacon Kaye, and Chris Sanchez, despite Fuller's protests. They bond as they train together and manage to pass their numerous tests; as they celebrate afterward, Street has a hostile run-in with Gamble. The team then succeeds in their first real mission: subduing an unstable gunman by using a wall-breaching battering ram designed by Street.

French drug lord Alexander Montel arrives in Los Angeles and kills his uncle for embezzlement, after assuming control of his family's criminal empire by killing his father. As he drives to the airport in his uncle's car, he is pulled over by police for a broken tail light, and detained due to discrepancies with his false I.D.; authorities determine that he is an international fugitive and is wanted in several countries. Montel's associates, disguised as LAPD officers, attempt to break him out as he is being transferred to jail, killing two Sheriff's deputies. Hondo's team manages to arrive in time to kill the gunmen and recapture Montel. As reporters swarm the team, Montel announces to the cameras that he is willing to offer 100 million dollars to whoever is able to break him out, which draws the attention of criminals across the city.

The LAPD prepare to transfer Montel into federal custody by air, but are unable to escape before Gamble shoots down the helicopter. The police send out a large convoy, which is ambushed by gang members but discovered to be a decoy for Hondo's team, who transport Montel in two SUVs. McCabe reveals himself to be in league with Gamble, who critically wounds Boxer and escapes with Montel and McCabe to the subway, where they hijack a subway car and flee through the sewers as the SWAT team gives chase. Fuller then sends all available units to Hawthorne Airport to prevent Montel from escaping by plane.

Hondo's team commandeers a limousine to reach the airport, but realize that Gamble has a private plane which will land on the Sixth Street Bridge to fly the criminals out of the country. Preparing to take off, the plane is intercepted by the SWAT team; Gamble's men are killed, Sanchez is wounded while Kaye arrests Montel, and Hondo confronts McCabe, who commits suicide. Street pursues Gamble to the railyard under the bridge, where they fight hand-to-hand until Gamble is knocked under a passing train and killed. Fuller and the rest of the LAPD arrive, and Hondo's team deliver Montel to federal prison. As the team drive back to Los Angeles, they receive a report of an armed robbery in progress to which Hondo readies his team with prompting from Street.

Cast
 Colin Farrell as Officer III James "Jim" Street
 Jeremy Renner as Officer III Brian Gamble, quits police department after bank robbery case. Mastermind of Montel's escape.
 Brian Van Holt as Officer III Michael Boxer
 Samuel L. Jackson as Sergeant II Dan "Hondo" Harrelson
 Michelle Rodriguez as Officer III Christina "Chris" Sanchez
 LL Cool J as Officer III Deacon "Deke" Kaye
 Olivier Martinez as Alex "Le Loup Rouge" Montel (his nickname means The Red Wolf)
 Josh Charles as Officer III Travis Joseph "T.J." McCabe 
 Ken Davitian as Martin Gascoigne
 Reg E. Cathey as Lieutenant II Greg Velasquez
 Larry Poindexter as Captain II Tom Fuller
 Page Kennedy as Travis
 Domenick Lombardozzi as GQ - Officer - Portraying
 Denis Arndt as Sergeant Howard
 Jeff Wincott as Ed Taylor

Original series actors Steve Forrest and Rod Perry have cameo appearances; Forrest drives the team's van, while Perry appears as Kaye's father.

Reed Diamond has a cameo as Officer David Burress. Diamond and director Clark Johnson appeared together on Homicide: Life on the Street for three seasons (in two of which their characters were partners). Johnson himself has a cameo as "Deke's Handsome Partner," who gets hit with a pan while Deke chases a suspect.

Production

Development 
The idea for a film adaptation of the 1975 S.W.A.T. TV series was conceived in 1997. Michael Bay, Rob Cohen, Antoine Fuqua, Michael Mann, Joel Schumacher, Tony Scott, Zack Snyder, Roger Spottiswoode, Marcus Nispel, and John Woo were all approached to direct the film before Clark Johnson signed on. They passed because they were all busy with other projects. Oliver Stone was also involved as a producer at one point.

Following the box office success of The Fast and the Furious (2001), Neal H. Moritz was hired to produce the project.

Casting 
Mark Wahlberg was the first choice for the role of Jim Street, but turned it down in favor of portraying the lead role in The Italian Job. Paul Walker was originally cast and had even started training for the part, but had to drop out due to filming on 2 Fast 2 Furious. Colin Farrell eventually replaced him in July 2002. Vin Diesel was offered to portray Deacon "Deke" Kaye, but passed because he was in production with The Chronicles of Riddick and LL Cool J was then cast in September 2002. At one point during the early stages of development, Arnold Schwarzenegger was considered for the role of Dan "Hondo" Harrelson, but he declined and Samuel L. Jackson took the part.

Jeremy Renner was cast as Brian Gamble following his performance in Dahmer. He was originally offered a role in The Big Bounce, but Renner turned it down.

Filming 
All filming were shot on location in Los Angeles. The bank robbery in the film's opening was choreographed to closely resemble the North Hollywood shootout of 1997. It was filmed at an abandoned building at the corner Workman St and N Broadway in Lincoln Heights. The unit's training scenes were filmed at the city's historic Ambassador Hotel; the building was demolished in 2006. The film's climax was shot on the former Sixth Street Viaduct, once one of Hollywood's most popular bridges for location filming.

Soundtrack 

Elliot Goldenthal composed the soundtrack.

Release
S.W.A.T. saw a nationwide release in North America playing in 3,202 theaters, on the weekend of August 8, 2003.

The film was released in Japan in the weekend of 27 September 2003 and United Kingdom, in the weekend of December 4, 2003.

Home media
The film was released on DVD as S.W.A.T. Widescreen Special Edition on December 30, 2003 and on Blu-ray Disc on September 19, 2006.

Reception

Box office
In its opening weekend, S.W.A.T. grossed $37,062,535 playing in 3,202 theaters, with a $11,574 average per theatre and ranking at #1. The biggest market in other territories being Japan, United Kingdom, Spain and Germany, where the film grossed $16.9 million, $9.7 million, $7.1 million, $6.47 million respectively. At the end of its box office run, S.W.A.T. grossed  $116,934,650 in North America and $90,790,989 in other territories, resulting in a $207,725,639 worldwide gross.

Critical response
Reception for the movie was mixed. On Rotten Tomatoes, the film has an approval rating of 48%, based on 168 reviews, with an average rating of 5.42/10. The site's consensus reads, "A competent, but routine police thriller." On Metacritic, the film has a score of 45 out of 100, based on 35 critics, indicating "Mixed or average reviews". Audiences surveyed by CinemaScore gave the film a grade B+ on a scale of A to F.

Film critic Roger Ebert of the Chicago Sun-Times gave S.W.A.T. a favorable rating of three stars, as well as a thumbs up on At the Movies. He complimented the characters, dialogue, and the action sequences, which he found believable.

Accolades

Legacy

Film

A direct-to-video film titled S.W.A.T.: Firefight came out in 2011. None of the main actors reprised their roles. 
A second direct-to-video movie titled S.W.A.T.: Under Siege came out in 2017.

Television series

In February 2017, CBS ordered a pilot based on the movie with Justin Lin, Shawn Ryan, and Moritz as producers. Stephanie Sigman, Shemar Moore, and Jay Harrington were reported to star in the series. Justin Lin was announced to be directing the pilot.

References

External links 

 
 
 
 

2003 action thriller films
2003 crime thriller films
2003 directorial debut films
2003 films
African-American action films
American action thriller films
American crime thriller films
Columbia Pictures films
Fictional portrayals of the Los Angeles Police Department
Films about bank robbery
Films based on television series
Films directed by Clark Johnson
Films scored by Elliot Goldenthal
Films set in 2002
Films set in Los Angeles
Films with screenplays by David Ayer
Hood films
Original Film films
S.W.A.T. (franchise)
2000s English-language films
2000s American films